Machideva Jayanthi is traditionally observed by the Madivalas and is observed as a celebrate in the Indian state of Karnataka.  It marks the birthday of Madivala Machideva, 12th-century Warrior-Saint, and the founding saint of the Madivala religion. The festival is celebrated with much pomp and gaiety all over south India, majorly in Karnataka, Maharashtra, Andhra Pradesh and Tamil Nadu.

References 

Culture of Karnataka
Lingayatism
Hindu festivals
Birthdays
Religious festivals in India